Jules Mouquet (July 10, 1867 – October 25, 1946) was a French composer.

Biography 
Jules Mouquet studied at the Conservatoire de Paris with Théodore Dubois and Xavier Leroux. In 1896, he won the prestigious Prix de Rome with his cantata Mélusine. He went on to win another two composition prizes, the Prix Trémont (1905) and the Prix Chartier (1907). Mouquet became professor of harmony at the Conservatoire de Paris in 1913. One of his notable students was Léo-Pol Morin.

Works 
Mouquet's main influences were the late Romantic and Impressionist composers. His best known work is probably his Sonata, Op. 15 La Flûte de Pan, composed in 1906, with versions for flute and orchestra, and flute and piano.

External links 
 Jules Mouquet | Classical Composers Database

20th-century classical composers
Prix de Rome for composition
French classical composers
French male classical composers
Conservatoire de Paris alumni
Academic staff of the Conservatoire de Paris
1867 births
1946 deaths
Musicians from Paris
20th-century French composers
20th-century French male musicians